Malhi or Mallhi (Punjabi: مَلْہی (Shahmukhi); मल्ही (Gurmukhi)) is a clan of the Jat tribe found primarily in the Punjab region of Pakistan and India.

Notable individuals of the Malhi clan include:

 Ali Asjad Malhi, Pakistani politician of Jat ancestry

References

Surnames
Jat clans
Jat clans of Punjab